Festuca valesiaca, the Volga fescue, is a species of flowering plant in the family Poaceae. It is native to Europe and Asia. It was introduced to North America when it was deliberately planted. There it can be found in such US states as Arizona, Kansas, Montana, Vermont and Wyoming.

References

valesiaca
Grasses of Asia
Grasses of Europe